Rasmus Bøgh Wallin (born 2 January 1996) is a Danish cyclist, who currently rides for UCI Continental team .

Major results

2014
 3rd Road race, National Junior Road Championships
2016
 3rd Time trial, National Under–23 Road Championships
2017
 1st Kalmar Grand Prix
 5th ZLM Tour
 6th Overall Ronde van Midden-Nederland
 8th Skive–Løbet
2018
 1st Skive–Løbet
 3rd Ronde van Midden-Nederland
 4th Omloop Mandel-Leie-Schelde
 6th Overall Olympia's Tour
2019
 1st Scandinavian Race in Uppsala
 4th Skive–Løbet
2021
 Danmark Rundt
1st  Mountains classification
1st  Active rider classification
 2nd Fyen Rundt
 3rd Himmerland Rundt
2022
 1st  Overall Okolo Jižních Čech
1st Stages 1 & 4
 Danmark Rundt
1st  Mountains classification
1st  Active rider classification
 1st Scandinavian Race in Uppsala
 2nd Grote Prijs Rik Van Looy
 4th Arno Wallaard Memorial
2023
 1st Stage 1 Visit South Aegean Islands

References

External links

1996 births
Living people
Danish male cyclists